Binnein Mòr is the highest peak in the Mamores, the range of mountains between Glen Nevis and Loch Leven in the Highlands of Scotland and lies five kilometres north north-east of Kinlochleven.  The pyramidal summit of Binnein Mòr lies above the uninhabited upper section of Glen Nevis, north of the main Mamores ridge.  To the south, a short narrow ridge links to the main ridge at an unnamed 1062 m subsidiary top listed in Munro's Tables as Binnein Mòr south top.  Binnein Mòr's second subsidiary top, Sgòr Eilde Beag (956 m), lies about a kilometre to the southeast and forms the eastern end of the main Mamores ridge.

Despite being the highest mountain in the Mamores, Binnein Mòr is not one of the most commonly visited, due in part to its relative remoteness.  It is most frequently climbed from Kinlochleven, often together with Na Gruagaichean, the next peak to the west.

See also 
 Ben Nevis
 List of Munro mountains
 Mountains and hills of Scotland

References

External links

Munros
Marilyns of Scotland
Mountains and hills of the Central Highlands
Mountains and hills of Highland (council area)
One-thousanders of Scotland